Afterwords  is an album by the Dutch rock band The Gathering, released via Psychonaut Records on 25 October 2013. It is referred to as either a studio album or a remix album, containing remakes of five songs from Disclosure, but the band consider Afterwords more like an EP. Drummer Hans Rutten has stated, "We all see Disclosure as our last studio album, and Afterwords was more or less a Disclosure after-party... It's a mini album, maybe, but it's a long album. But that said, we don't see it as a full-length album of The Gathering, more as sort of an EP kind of thing." The record is the last album before the band went on hiatus and bassist Marjolein Kooijman quit in 2014.

Song information 

S.I.B.A.L.D. stands for "Sometimes it's better a little dusty".

Areas is a cover of synthpop band New Musik from their 1981 album Anywhere.

The title track features Bart Smits on vocals, in a clean singing style as opposed to his growling in the band's death-doom debut Always....

Reception

Track listing

Personnel

The Gathering 

Silje Wergeland : vocals, lyrics (except track 4), piano (on track 8)
René Rutten : guitar, bass (on tracks 2, 3, 4, 6), mixing, recording, engineer, music (on tracks 1, 2, 6, 8), producer
Marjolein Kooijman : bass (on tracks 1, 8, 9), guitar (on track 8)
Hans Rutten : drums
Frank Boeijen : keyboards, mixing, recording, engineer, music (on track 2, 4, 5, 6, 7, 8, 9), vocals (on track 3)

Guest musicians 
Noel Hofman: trumpet on tracks 1 and 9
Bart Smits: vocals and lyrics on track 4
Jakob Johannessen: speech on track 9

Production 
Martijn Busink: design
Carlos Manuel Vergara Rivera: illustration
Paul Matthijs Lombert: mastering
Tony Mansfield: music and lyrics on track 3
Gema Pérez: photography

References

External links 
Afterwords on thegathering.bandcamp.com

The Gathering (band) albums
2013 albums